In 1776, Wolfgang Amadeus Mozart composed three piano concertos, one of which was the Concerto for three pianos and orchestra in F major, No. 7, K. 242. He originally finished it in February 1776 for three pianos; however, when he eventually recomposed it for himself and another pianist in 1780 in Salzburg, he rearranged it for two pianos, and that is how the piece is often performed today. The concerto is often nicknamed "Lodron" because it was commissioned by Countess Antonia Lodron to be played with her two daughters Aloysia and Giuseppa. The third piano part, intended for the younger daughter, is more moderate in its technical demands.

The concerto is scored for 2 oboes, 2 horns, 3 solo pianos and strings. It has 3 movements:

Allegro 
Adagio in B-flat major 
Rondo: Tempo di minuetto 

Girdlestone, in his Mozart and his Piano Concertos, describes the concerto and compares one of the themes of its slow movement to similar themes that turn up in later concertos – especially No. 25, K. 503 – in more developed forms.

The first British performance was given by the New Queen's Hall Orchestra at The Proms, Queen's Hall on 12 September 1907. The soloists were Henry Wood, York Bowen and Frederick Kiddle, under the baton of Henri Verbrugghen.

References

External links 

Article, source for dates above. Quotes Alfred Einstein's Mozart: His Character, His Work. Einstein discusses the work briefly – two lines in two pages – dismissing it as the least of Mozart's concertos with piano.

 Performance (audio) by Robert Casadesus, Gaby Casadesus, Jean Casadesus and Eugene Ormandy conducting the Philadelphia Orchestra in 1963 – via Internet Archive

07
Mozart07
Compositions in F major
1776 compositions